The name Daniel has been used for eight tropical cyclones in the eastern Pacific Ocean.
 Hurricane Daniel (1978), a Category 3 hurricane that did not affect land.
 Hurricane Daniel (1982), a Category 3 which reached Hawaii as a tropical depression and dissipated in the Alenuihaha Channel between Maui and the Big Island.
 Tropical Storm Daniel (1988), did not make landfall.
 Tropical Storm Daniel (1994), no reports of damage or casualties.
 Hurricane Daniel (2000), a Category 3 hurricane that threatened Hawaii for a time while weakening.
 Hurricane Daniel (2006), a powerful Category 4 hurricane that brought rain to Hawaii as a tropical depression.
 Hurricane Daniel (2012), a Category 3 hurricane that did not affect land.
 Tropical Storm Daniel (2018), a weak tropical storm that never threatened land.

Pacific hurricane set index articles